The Southern Mail is a local newspaper from the South Peninsula region of Cape Town, Western Cape, South Africa.

References

Weekly newspapers published in South Africa
Mass media in Cape Town
Publications with year of establishment missing